Malik Al Nasir, born Mark Trevor Watson (1966, Liverpool, England) is a British author and performance poet, born to a Welsh mother and a Guyanese father. Malik is the band leader of Malik & the O.G's. Spurred by discovering his striking resemblance to early black footballer Andrew Watson, he began to research his family ancestry, discovering both slaves and slave-owners.

Early life
Mark T. Watson was born in 1966, one of four siblings to a white Welsh mother and a black Guyanese father. Liverpool, a major port city, was poor and racism was rife; the Toxteth riots shook the city in 1981.

The care system
His father worked as a merchant seaman and a security guard; his mother worked in a factory. When Mark was nine years old, his father became paralysed and, believing that his mother could not cope, the local authority took Mark and one of his brothers into their care. (Reynold became "politicised and well-read".) There he faced neglect, racism and physical abuse, until he was discharged from the system at 18, functionally illiterate and without connections. 

Many years later, he successfully sued the local authority, and received a substantial payout and a public apology from the Lord Mayor of Liverpool. He spent ten years in litigation, durig which time he pursued educational qualifications in order to better research his own case. He was represented by Allan Levy QC, a noted children's advocate who co-chaired the 1990 public inquiry into pin-down, a punitive technique used in children's homes.

Gil Scott-Heron
At 18, he was introduced by the photographer Penny Potter to Gil Scott-Heron, who had a profound effect on his life. Scott-Heron was an African-American poet-musician, part of the Black Arts Movement and best-known for the song "The Revolution Will Not Be Televised". (His father, Gil Heron, was, like Andrew Watson, a Scottish footballer from the Caribbean.) Scott-Heron supported the young man over many years, encouraging him to learn to read fluently and to write poetry, and developing his understanding of Black consciousness.

Recordings, publications, and media production
Eventually Watson compiled the writings of his late teens and twenties, both poems and explanatory prose, into a book entitled Ordinary Guy. It was released in 2004 by Fore-Word Press, the publishing house he had founded. The book was written in tribute to Scott-Heron & The Last Poets, and includes a foreword by Jalal Mansur Nuriddin.

In 2006, Al-Nasir co-founded Dubai-based production company MediaCPR and its record label MCPR Music. Conceptually MediaCPR wanted to develop clean content in mainstream music, that could entertain listeners without being offensive or explicit. Malik and his team of music producers pioneered a new genre of music which they called "Drum Fusion". The idea was to unite traditional rhythms with contemporary song arrangements and apply positive lyrical content to produce a new style of music, which could be applied to any genre. The drum fusion formula involves developing a full organic sound composition derived exclusively from the use of drum, percussion, the human voice and natural sounds such as wind, rain, running water etc. 

The first album released using this formula was Drumquestra (2009), by Jamaican master percussionist Larry McDonald (percussionist), who wanted to showcase his 50-year recording career. The concept was developed collaboratively between Al Nasir, as executive producer, Larry McDonald, and producer Sidney Mills from Steel Pulse. One of the tracks, Set the Children Free, was recorded for the album by Toots & the Maytals. A dance remix by Lenny B demonstrated that the "Drum Fusion" formula could cross genres and be relevant to the young, as well as the old traditionalists. Al-Nasir co-wrote two tracks on Drumquestra: "Peace of Mind" (which he co-produced with Sidney Mills featuring Shaza) and and "Crime Or Music" (featuring veteran ska musician Stranger Cole and reggae drummer Sly Dunbar). Additional percussion on this track was provided by Sticky Thompson of The Wailers and Bongo Herman.

Al-Nasir featured in Word Up – From Ghetto to Mecca (2011), a documentary about performance poetry. It was produced by UKTV's commissioning editor Shirani Sabaratnam and included Scott-Heron, The Last Poets and Benjamin Zephaniah. Fore-Word Press screened the film at the Phoenix Cinema, Leicester, as part of the 2011 Black History Month events, sponsored by Leicester City Council.

Al-Nasir wrote and produced two albums of his poetry and songs, Rhythms of the Diaspora Vol. 1 & 2, 2015, featuring Scott-Heron, The Last Poets, LL Cool J, Stanley Clarke, Swiss Chris, Rod Youngs, Larry McDonald, and Ms Marie Labropolus. The albums were recorded at Sarm Studios in Reading, Mercredi 9 Studios in Paris and Wyclef Jean's Platinum Sound Recording Studios in New York. Mixed by Serge Tsai and mastered by Chris Gehringer at Sterling Sound New York.

Ancestry research
Malik is currently researching the life of Andrew Watson (24 May 1856 – 8 March 1921) who was the first black footballer in history – and one of the architects of the game of soccer as it is known today – for inclusion in a book about the life of Watson, who came from Guyana in 1860 (being an unconfirmed but likely relative of Malik) and ended up captaining Scotland in the 1880s.

Education
In 2010, Malik Al Nasir graduated with an MA in New Media Production from Liverpool Screen School, a faculty of Liverpool John Moores University. For his thesis piece he created a web-based multimedia software program for genealogical family tree building, called Ancestory. The software allows for the building of interactive multimedia family trees, that can be shared over social networks and authored by the public. Ancestory was probably the first interactive multimedia family tree builder, with social network integration.

Malik also holds a BA Honours in Geography & Sociology from Liverpool Hope University and a PgDip in Applied Social Research from The University of Liverpool. He developed a think tank with sociologist Ronaldo Munck

Malik is a social commentator on issues relating to refugees, social exclusion, asylum seekers, and social unrest in Liverpool and racism.

Al-Nasir wrote The Guardian obituary for Jalal Mansur Nuriddin, entitled "The grandfather of rap".

Event producer and performer
Al-Nasir formed a band named Malik & the O.G's, standing for "Ordinary Guys". The band included Malik Al Nasir, Orphy Robinson, Rod Youngs, Mohammed Nazam, Paislie Reid, Shaza Tiago Coimbra and engineer Tom Parker.

In 2013, Al-Nasir and his publishing house were asked to produce a live show of the world's first rap album Hustlers Convention. The event, at the Jazz Cafe in Camden, North London, was filmed for the making of a documentary of the same name. The film was directed by Mike Todd of Riverhorse TV and executive produced by Public Enemy's Chuck D. The live event was sponsored by Charly Records, who re-issuesd the album to commemorate both 40 years of "The Hustlers Convention" and 40 years of the company. Malik was the associate producer of the film, as well as an interviewee, presenting a segment to camera. Malik & the O.G's (Cleveland Watkiss, Orphy Robinson, Rod Youngs & Hawi Gondwe) supported Jalal and The Jazz Warriors International Collective  at the event.

The death of his mentor, Gil Scott-Heron, led Al Nasir to perform acts of tribute, such as at Liverpool International Music Festival 2013. Two years later, the Festival commissioned him to produce a range of events, including its opening night. On UNESCO International Day for the Remembrance of the Slave Trade and its Abolition he produced "Poets Against Apartheid"  at the International Slavery Museum, featuring readings from Tayo Aluko, Jean Binta Breeze MBE, and the Incognito Gospel Choir. A few days later at St George's Hall, Liverpool, he produced, in partnership with nightclub entrepreneur and promoter Richard McGinnis, "The Revolution Will Be Live – A Tribute to Gil Scott-Heron". The MC was BBC Radio Merseyside presenter Ngunan Adamu, and the show featured
Al-Nasir's own band, Malik & the O.G's, as well as Talib Kweli, Aswad, The Christians, Craig Charles, DJ 2Kind, Sophia Ben-Yousef, and Cleveland Watkiss.

Al Nasir was invited to tour Canada with Last Poets founder member Jalal Mansur Nuriddin for Black History Month (February 2016). Events at Harbourfront in Toronto reached the national press The pair screened two films,Hustlers Convention and Word-Up, and participated in workshops, seminars, school visits and performances in Toronto Ottawa and Mississauga. 

Al Nasir was invited back in March 2016 further promoting his film Word-Up and performing with his band Malik & the O.G's featuring Ottawa R & B artists Rita Carter. 'The Revolution Will Be Live' again toured the UK in Nov 2017 with Scott-Heron's former musical director Kim Jordan joining Malik & the O.G's and featured Canadian singer Rita Carter.

Radio appearances
  "Outlook" BBC World Service – "After the death of legendary musician Gil Scott-Heron, we find out how he transformed the life of a young British man."
  "Radio WBAI New York" – 'Radio interview Malik Al Nasir, Bilal Sunni Ali and Tommy Abney with Umar Ben Hassan of The Last Poets'
  "Saturday Live BBC Radio 4 London" – 'Radio interview – Malik Al Nasir, Al Jarreau and Brian Ball with Clare Balding- live from Centre Court at Wimbledon'
  "Roger Phillips Show" BBC Radio Merseyside Malik talks about his life with Gil Scott-Heron & The Last Poets
  "Benji B", BBC Radio 1Xtra "Gone too soon" with KRS-One, Nas and Shabazz Palaces

Filmography
  "Word Up – From Ghetto To Mecca" featuring Gil Scott-Heron, The Last Poets, Malik Al Nasir and Benjamin Zephaniah.
  "Africa" – Malik & the O.G's featuring Rod Youngs, and Larry McDonald (percussionist). – Music Video, produced by HQ Creative and directed by Mitchel Stuart for MCPR Music.
  "BBC News – Toxteth Riots" Malik Al Nasir's social commentary on the Toxteth Riots of 1981 and 2011.
  "Hustlers Convention" – Featuring Chuck D, Melle Mel, Alan Douglas, Ron Saint Germain, Malik Al Nasir, Fab Five Freddy, Last Poets by Producer and Director Mike Todd of Riverhorse TV in Manchester UK. 2014
  "Who Is Gil Scott-Heron?" – Featuring Kimberley Jordan, Glen Turner, Richard Russell (XL Recordings), Jamie Byng, Malik Al Nasir. Producer and Director Iain Forsyth and Jane Pollard for Beggars Banquet UK. 2015

Discography
  Drumquestra by Larry McDonald (percussionist) 2009 for MCPR Music. Tracks "Crime or Music"was written by Malik Al Nasir for Larry McDonald (percussionist) with Squiddly Cole, performed by Ska veteran Stranger Cole and Sly Dunbar. Also "Peace of Mind" was written by Malik Al Nasir & Bobby Rodell Davis. Malik Al Nasir was also Executive Producer for the whole album, Ft. Sly Dunbar, Stranger Cole, Steel Pulse, The Wailers, Dollarman, Bongo Herman, Mutabaruka, Toots & the Maytals, Bob Andy Marivaldo Dos Santos and JD Smooth.
  Rhythms of the Diaspora Vol 1. by Malik & the O.G's  – Written and produced by Malik Al Nasir. Ft. Gil Scott-Heron, LL Cool J, Ms Marie Labropoulos.
  Rhythms of the Diaspora Vol 2. by Malik & the O.G's – Written and produced by Malik Al Nasir. Co produced by Swiss Chris, Ft. Larry McDonald (percussionist), Stanley Clarke, The Last Poets.
  Urban Griot by Raw UnLtd. Ft. Hard City Klick HCK – Unreleased. Tracks such as Multi-Media were co-written by Malik Al Nasir. Malik was also the executive producer of the album. The producer was Lloyd Masset. The album was recorded at Hookend Recording Studios in Oxfordshire and mixed by Andy Grassi at Wyclef Jeans Platinum Sound Recording Studios in NYC.

Collaboration albums

Discography

Other works
Letters to Gil. A memoir. Foreword by Lemn Sissay.  William Collins. 2021.

References

Further reading

External links
His Cambridge Digital Humanities page

1966 births
Living people
British record producers
British spoken word artists
Alumni of the University of Liverpool
Alumni of Liverpool Hope University
Alumni of Liverpool John Moores University
Musicians from Liverpool
Spoken word poets
English male poets
Black British musicians
English people of Guyanese descent
English people of Welsh descent